Crosscurrents is an album by jazz pianist Lennie Tristano. The sides were recorded in 1949 and the album released by Capitol in 1972. The album was inducted into the Grammy Hall of Fame in 2013.

Music
The first seven tracks are recordings of Tristano's sextet, containing Warne Marsh (tenor sax), Lee Konitz (alto sax), Billy Bauer (guitar), Arnold Fishkin (bass), and Harold Granowsky or Denzil Best (drums; separately). They include "the earliest examples of free improvisation in jazz: 'Intuition' and 'Digression'". It was reissued by Capitol as part of the Intuition 1996 CD re-issue, in combination with Warne Marsh's Jazz of Two Cities.

Track listing
All tracks composed by Lennie Tristano, except where indicated.

"Wow"
"Crosscurrent"
"Yesterdays"
"Marionette"
"Sax of a Kind"
"Intuition"
"Digression"

Personnel
Lennie Tristano – piano
Warne Marsh – tenor sax
Lee Konitz – alto sax
Billy Bauer – guitar
Arnold Fishkin – bass
Harold Granowsky – drums
Denzil Best – drums

References

Lennie Tristano albums
1972 albums
Capitol Records albums
Grammy Hall of Fame Award recipients